"I'm Gonna Get Me A Gun" is a song that Cat Stevens wrote, composed, and recorded in 1967, and was produced by Mike Hurst of Decca Records's recently added Deram Records label. It was released as a 45 in the UK, reaching number 6 in the UK Singles Chart, and it was featured on U.S pressings of his debut album Matthew and Son.

Personnel
Cat Stevens - vocals
Alan Tew - orchestral arrangements

Subject
The song's protagonist is a young man who means to obtain a gun, out of frustration with his grinding, unfulfilling work and the lack of respect he apparently receives from his co-workers. The selection can be perceived as a kind of sequel to "Matthew and Son."

“I'm Gonna Get Me a Gun” was written, composed, and originally released in the middle 1960s, years before workplace violence became a major problem in the United States.

Charts
Song

References

External links

1967 singles
Cat Stevens songs
Songs written by Cat Stevens
Deram Records singles
Song recordings produced by Mike Hurst (producer)
1967 songs